William Marvin Whittington (September 11, 1949 – April 23, 2021) was an American racing driver from Lubbock, Texas, who won the 24 Hours of Le Mans and competed five times in the Indianapolis 500.

Career
Whittington, together with his brother Don Whittington and the German professional Klaus Ludwig, multiple winner at Le Mans and elsewhere, competed in the 1979 24 Hours of Le Mans in a Porsche 935. As the brothers did not have substantial racing experience prior to the late 1970s. Bill's brother Dale Whittington also competed in open wheel racing. Together with Randy Lanier they owned the Blue Thunder Racing Team in 1984, with Marty Hinze. Bill also raced in the Indianapolis 500 five times with a best finish of 14th in 1985.

Bill made two NASCAR Winston Cup starts in 1980, earning an 8th in his debut at Riverside International Raceway (besting brother Don by one spot) and then 32nd in the Daytona 500.

The Whittingtons raced aircraft prior to cars, Bill having won races at Reno between 1978 and 1983.  They were the owners of the Road Atlanta circuit.

In 1986, Bill pleaded guilty to income tax evasion and conspiracy to smuggle marijuana into the United States from Colombia and was sentenced to 15 years in prison and ordered to surrender $7 million in property and other assets. In 1987, his brother Don Whittington pleaded guilty to money laundering charges in association with his brother's activities. In addition to Bill and Don Whittington, Lanier, John Paul Sr. and John Paul Jr. were part of the IMSA drug smuggling scandal of the 1980s, where a number of drivers financed their racing activities with the proceeds from drug smuggling.

Death 

At age 71, Whittington died in an airplane crash near Winslow, Arizona, on April 23, 2021.  According to Randy Lanier and other acquaintances contacted by Autoweek, Whittington owned the aircraft, and was the pilot on the accident flight. Lanier said that Whittington was giving a ride to an unidentified friend who "was terminally ill with cancer and had lost his pilot's license," and that he "wanted to give him an experience of flying again."

The accident aircraft was a Swearingen SA226-T(B) Merlin IIIB, aircraft registration N59EZ; it was destroyed when it impacted terrain under unknown circumstances. FlightAware shows the aircraft taking off from Scottsdale Airport and flying northeast near Winslow before crashing just north of Interstate 40 on a desert road. The accident is under investigation by the Federal Aviation Administration and the National Transportation Safety Board.

Indianapolis 500 results

24 Hours of Le Mans results

References

External links
 
RARA stats from airrace.org

1949 births
2021 deaths
Indianapolis 500 drivers
NASCAR drivers
24 Hours of Le Mans drivers
24 Hours of Le Mans winning drivers
Sportspeople from Lubbock, Texas
Racing drivers from Texas
World Sportscar Championship drivers
American cannabis traffickers
Aviators killed in aviation accidents or incidents in the United States
Victims of aviation accidents or incidents in 2021